Positron emission tomography–computed tomography (better known as  PET-CT or PET/CT) is a nuclear medicine technique which combines, in a single gantry, a positron emission tomography (PET) scanner and an x-ray computed tomography (CT) scanner, to acquire sequential images from both devices in the same session, which are combined into a single superposed (co-registered) image. Thus, functional imaging obtained by PET, which depicts the spatial distribution of metabolic or biochemical activity in the body can be more precisely aligned or correlated with anatomic imaging obtained by CT scanning. Two- and three-dimensional image reconstruction may be rendered as a function of a common software and control system.

PET-CT has revolutionized medical diagnosis in many fields, by adding precision of anatomic localization to functional imaging, which was previously lacking from pure PET imaging. For example, many diagnostic imaging procedures in oncology, surgical planning, radiation therapy and cancer staging have been changing rapidly under the influence of PET-CT availability, and centers have been gradually abandoning conventional PET devices and substituting them by PET-CTs. Although the combined/hybrid device is considerably more expensive, it has the advantage of providing both functions as stand-alone examinations, being, in fact, two devices in one.

The only other obstacle to the wider use of PET-CT is the difficulty and cost of producing and transporting the radiopharmaceuticals used for PET imaging, which are usually extremely short-lived. For instance, the half-life of radioactive fluorine-18 (18F) used to trace glucose metabolism (using fluorodeoxyglucose, FDG) is only two hours. Its production requires a very expensive cyclotron as well as a production line for the radiopharmaceuticals. At least one PET-CT radiopharmaceutical is made on site from a generator: Ga-68 from a gallium-68 generator.

PET-MRI, like PET-CT, combines modalities to produce co-registered images.

History 

The combination of PET and CT scanners was first suggested by R. Raylman in his 1991 Ph.D. thesis.  The first PET-CT systems were constructed by David Townsend (at the University of Geneva) and Ronald Nutt (at CPS Innovations in Knoxville, TN) with help from colleagues. The first PET-CT prototype for clinical evaluation was funded by the NCI and installed at the University of Pittsburgh Medical Center in 1998. The first commercial system reached the market by 2001, and by 2004, over 400 systems had been installed worldwide.

Procedure for FDG imaging 

An example of how PET-CT works in the work-up of FDG metabolic mapping follows:
 Before the exam, the patient fasts for at least 6 hours.
 On the day of the exam, the patient rests lying for a minimum of 15 min, in order to quiet down muscular activity, which might be interpreted as abnormal metabolism.
 An intravenous bolus injection of a dose of recently produced 2-FDG or 3-FDG is made, usually by arm vein.
 After one or two hours, the patient is placed into the PET-CT device, usually lying in a supine position with the arms resting at the sides, or brought together above the head, depending on the main region of interest (ROI).
 An automatic bed moves head first into the gantry, first obtaining a tomogram, also called a scout view or surview, which is a kind of whole body flat sagittal section, obtained with the X-ray tube fixed into the upper position.
 The operator uses the PET-CT computer console to identify the patient and examination, delimit the caudal and rostral limits of the body scan onto the scout view, selects the scanning parameters and starts the image acquisition period, which follows without human intervention.
 The patient is automatically moved head first into the CT gantry, and the x-ray tomogram is acquired.
 Now the patient is automatically moved through the PET gantry, which is mounted in parallel with the CT gantry, and the PET slices are acquired.
 The patient may now leave the device, and the PET-CT software starts reconstructing and aligning the PET and CT images.

A whole body scan, which usually is made from mid-thighs to the top of the head, takes from 5 minutes to 40 minutes depending on the acquisition protocol and technology of the equipment used. FDG imaging protocols acquires slices with a thickness of 2 to 3 mm. Hypermetabolic lesions are shown as false color-coded pixels or voxels onto the gray-value coded CT images. Standardized Uptake Values are calculated by the software for each hypermetabolic region detected in the image. It provides a quantification of size of the lesion, since functional imaging does not provide a precise anatomical estimate of its extent. The CT can be used for that, when the lesion is also visualized in its images (this is not always the case when hypermetabolic lesions are not accompanied by anatomical changes).

FDG doses in quantities sufficient to carry out 4–5 examinations are delivered daily, twice or more per day, by the provider to the diagnostic imaging center.

For uses in image-guided radiation therapy of cancer, special fiducial markers are placed in the patient's body before acquiring the PET-CT images. The slices thus acquired may be transferred digitally to a linear accelerator which is used to perform precise bombardment of the target areas using high energy photons (radiosurgery).

See also 
 Single-photon emission computed tomography
 Neuroimaging

References

External links 

 Human Health Campus, The official website of the International Atomic Energy Agency dedicated to Professionals in Radiation Medicine. This site is managed by the Division of Human Health, Department of Nuclear Sciences and Applications
 How PET CT works – from Harvard Medical School
 PET CT for evaluation of Lung Cancer – from Harvard Medical School

3D nuclear medical imaging
Computing in medical imaging
Medical physics
Neuroimaging